The Tour du Mali was a cycling race held in Mali. It was part of UCI Africa Tour in category 2.2 in 2010. The race was held 3 times, in 2002, 2004 and 2010.

Winners

References

Cycle races in Mali
Recurring sporting events established in 2002
Recurring sporting events disestablished in 2010
UCI Africa Tour races
Defunct cycling races in Mali